Anne Ferguson is an Australian judge, who is currently the Chief Justice of the Supreme Court of Victoria.

Early life 
Ferguson was educated at the Brigidine Sisters’ Killester College in Springvale where she was academic dux. She studied Arts and Law at Monash University, winning the Supreme Court Prize as the top student in her graduating class. Ferguson was also appointed Editor of the Monash University Law Review.

In 1989, she graduated with a Doctor of Philosophy in Law from the University of Southampton. Her thesis was on unfair contracts.

Legal career 
Prior to her judicial appointments she worked as a litigator at J.M. Smith & Emmerton and Allens Arthur Robinson. She also previously served as Honorary Secretary to the Council of Legal Education, one of only 5 people to ever hold the position in the organization's 100-year history.

Judicial office 
Ferguson was first appointed a judge of the Trial Division of the Supreme Court of Victoria in 2010. In 2014, she was made a Judge of the Court of Appeal.

In August 2017, Ferguson was named as the next Chief Justice of Victoria, succeeding Marilyn Warren. Ferguson took office in October 2017. In her role as Chief Justice, Ferguson is chair of the Judicial Commission of Victoria.

In 2019, Ferguson heard the high profile County Court appeal of Cardinal George Pell against his conviction for the commission of sexual offences. Ferguson concurred with the Court of Appeal 2-1 majority rejecting the appeal, which was subsequently overruled by the High Court.

Personal life
Ferguson is married to fellow Supreme Court judge, Justice Kim Hargrave.

References

 

Chief Justices of Victoria
Judges of the Supreme Court of Victoria
Australian women judges
Women chief justices
21st-century Australian judges
Australian solicitors
Monash University alumni
Living people
Year of birth missing (living people)
Place of birth missing (living people)
Monash Law School alumni
21st-century women judges